William Fleming High School is a public school, one of the only two public high schools in the Roanoke City area school division, the other being the Patrick Henry High School. The edifice itself is located at 3649 Ferncliff Ave. Roanoke, Virginia 24017 and is positioned within the Miller/Arrowood neighborhood of the city. William Fleming along with the other public elementary, middle, and high schools comprise the Roanoke City Public School System that is regulated by the representatives that serve on the Roanoke City School Board.

History

Namesake
The name William Fleming derived from a Scottish immigrant who was a prominent physician and statesmen in Virginia. Originally a native of West Virginia, Fleming migrated into Virginian borders and settled in Norfolk in 1755. After he relocated into Norfolk, he hurriedly began to involve himself in the war effort as an active physician, serving alongside the regiment of colonel and future president George Washington against the French and the Indians. Then he was promoted to the rank of colonel and upheld his position while fighting in Lord Dunmore's War until he was injured, ultimately ending his service in the military. His significance in relation to the school came about after his militant service. He continued to help nurse the ailing and was an active participant in the matters concerning both Roanoke City and Virginia. Then he served in the General Assembly as the senator of Virginia and also as the governor for an abrupt period. Along with the school, a national historical marker on the Monterey Golf Course, which denotes the former location where Colonel Fleming's plantation stood, was dedicated to his contribution.

School
In September 1933, 152 students began the school year in a newly constructed building on a 7.5-acre (30,000 m2) tract which is the present site of Breckinridge Middle School in Roanoke. The original William Fleming High School consisted of five high school classrooms, one elementary classroom, a library, a reception room, a chemistry laboratory, two locker rooms, an auditorium, and an office. In 1949, William Fleming became part of the Roanoke City School System through the annexation of part of Roanoke County by the city. William Fleming was moved to its present location in 1961 near Hershberger Road NW. In 1989, eight auxiliary classrooms were added to accommodate the arrival of ninth graders on campus as middle schools were established in the city. A new $57 million building opened in 2009 next to the existing facilities, and the construction of the school's first on-campus football stadium was completed in 2010.

Academics
William Fleming High School is an institution that features grades 9-12, with a student enrollment of 1,664. The school offers the following curriculum/ courses for the students to take:

     Air Force ROTC
     Business
     Electives
     ELL
     English
     Fine Arts
     Fine/Practical arts
     Foreign Language
     Health/ PE
     Mathematic
     Plato Lab
     ROTEC
     Science
     Social Studies
     Special Education
     Photography

In 2009, the credibility of William Fleming's faculty and institution at large were challenged when some of the assistant principals, under the direction of head principal Susan Willis, manipulated 30 schedules of special education students to prevent them from taking the SOLs. The state-mandated exams test student's abilities in mathematics, English, and science to ensure that the curriculum of the school aligns with what the state believes the students should be learning. Thus, by preventing certain students from taking the tests, it increased the overall scores of the school. This infringement made the local and state news, making a spectacle of William Fleming. As a result, Willis was given paid leave and the assistant principals who worked in conjunction with her were fired. Since the dilemma Fleming has struggled to maintain its accreditation with regard to its SOLs, and was at risk of losing it during the school year 2010-2011 after being audited by the state of Virginia.

Athletics and extracurricular activities
William Fleming High School is a member of the Virginia High School League and competes in the 4A competition within conference 24 and the Blue Ridge District. Fleming formerly competed in the now defunct Group AAA Roanoke Valley District and the AA Blue Ridge District. William Fleming won the Group AA state title in men's basketball in 2007, and also captured two titles in the 1950s. Fleming has also in 1985 won the Group AAA state championship in men's outdoor track. The Colonels have two state runner-up finishes in men's AAA basketball and in AAA and AA football over the past 15 years.

William Fleming offers the following sports:

	
It also offers the following extracurricular activities: Beta Club, DECA, free dance, FBLA-PBL, Forensics, French Honor Society, HOSA, Key Club, SGA, SkillsUSA, Thespian Club

In the press

During spring break 2009, 7 students from William Fleming accompanied by students from James Madison University and representatives from Aid for America took a community service trip to Welch, West Virginia. The area is one of the poorest in the United States. The students help to renovate a dilapidated house so that a man, who lost all of his fingers in a mining incident, could gain custody of his child.

Also in 2011, Melissa Poff, an instructor at William Fleming, was named "Teacher of the Year." She was also publicly recognized and commended by the media of Roanoke City for "demonstrating unwavering commitment" to both the school and its students. To generate school spirit amongst the whole student body, in 2011 of the school year 2011-2012, the entire school participated in a videoed 'lip dub', a fusion of a song and lip-syncing. The goal was to promote school spirit and activity amongst the students. The song of choice was "Firework" by Katy Perry; the intended message of the song is to encourage people to be themselves.

Communally, the school has also helped in the retention of dropout students by hosting the Western Virginia Education Classic, a football game between two historically black colleges and universities. The proceeds from the game go toward the local TAP's Project Recovery Program that serves as a partnership with Roanoke City Schools to target and help students at risk of dropping out of school. After the demolition of Victory Stadium, Roanoke's premier football stadium, the classic was no longer being held. However, with Fleming's stadium the classic can proceed and the revenue can continue to help at-risk students.

Notable alumni
 Calvin Bannister (Class of 2002)  NFL defensive back
 Beth A. Brown (Class of 1987)  NASA astrophysicist 
 Troy Daniels (Class of 2009)  NBA player for the Los Angeles Lakers
 Jermaine Hardy (Class of 2000)  NFL defensive back
 Nidal Hasan (Class of 1988) — 2009 Fort Hood shooting killer
 Ashlee Holland (Class of 1997)  winner of I Wanna Be a Soap Star
 Pete Johnson (Class of 1954)  NFL running back
 Steve Robinson (Class of 1978)  assistant men's basketball coach at Arizona, former head coach at Tulsa and Florida State and former assistant coach at North Carolina
 John St. Clair (Class of 1995)  NFL offensive tackle
 Lee Suggs (Class of 1998)  NFL running back

References

External links
Virginia Department of Education Report Card
Great Schools site

Educational institutions established in 1933
Public high schools in Virginia
Schools in Roanoke, Virginia
International Baccalaureate schools in Virginia
1933 establishments in Virginia